Timotej Jambor (born 4 April 2003) is a Slovak professional footballer who currently plays for Fortuna Liga club MŠK Žilina as a forward.

Club career

MŠK Žilina
Jambor made his Fortuna Liga debut for Žilina during a home fixture against AS Trenčín on 21 November 2020. He came on in the second half to replace Matúš Rusnák, with the final score already set at 2:0 in favour of Šošoni through Ján Bernát and Dawid Kurminowski. He also appeared as a late substitute in the next fixture against Pohronie.

International career
Jambor was first recognised in a Slovak senior national team nomination as an alternate for prospective national team players' training camp in NTC Senec in December 2022, even prior to his call-up for the feeder U21 team.

Personal life 
His father, Milan Jambor, is also a footballer. He is currently the player-coach of FK Svit.

References

External links
 MŠK Žilina official club profile
 
 Futbalnet profile
 

2003 births
Living people
People from Svit
Sportspeople from the Prešov Region
Slovak footballers
Slovakia youth international footballers
Association football forwards
MŠK Žilina players
2. Liga (Slovakia) players
Slovak Super Liga players